A safety-critical system (SCS) or life-critical system is a system whose failure or malfunction may result in one (or more) of the following outcomes:

 death or serious injury to people
 loss or severe damage to equipment/property
 environmental harm

A safety-related system (or sometimes safety-involved system) comprises everything (hardware, software, and human aspects) needed to perform one or more safety functions, in which failure would cause a significant increase in the safety risk for the people or environment involved. Safety-related systems are those that do not have full responsibility for controlling hazards such as loss of life, severe injury or severe environmental damage.  The malfunction of a safety-involved system would only be that hazardous in conjunction with the failure of other systems or human error. Some safety organizations provide guidance on safety-related systems, for example the Health and Safety Executive (HSE) in the United Kingdom.

Risks of this sort are usually managed with the methods and tools of safety engineering. A safety-critical system is designed to lose less than one life per billion (109) hours of operation. Typical design methods include probabilistic risk assessment, a method that combines failure mode and effects analysis (FMEA) with fault tree analysis. Safety-critical systems are increasingly computer-based.

Reliability regimes
Several reliability regimes for safety-critical systems exist:

 Fail-operational systems continue to operate when their control systems fail. Examples of these include elevators, the gas thermostats in most home furnaces, and passively safe nuclear reactors. Fail-operational mode is sometimes unsafe. Nuclear weapons launch-on-loss-of-communications was rejected as a control system for the U.S. nuclear forces because it is fail-operational: a loss of communications would cause launch, so this mode of operation was considered too risky. This is contrasted with the fail-deadly behavior of the Perimeter system built during the Soviet era.
 Fail-soft systems are able to continue operating on an interim basis with reduced efficiency in case of failure. Most spare tires are an example of this: They usually come with certain restrictions (e.g. a speed restriction) and lead to lower fuel economy. Another example is the "Safe Mode" found in most Windows operating systems.
 Fail-safe systems become safe when they cannot operate. Many medical systems fall into this category. For example, an infusion pump can fail, and as long as it alerts the nurse and ceases pumping, it will not threaten the loss of life because its safety interval is long enough to permit a human response. In a similar vein, an industrial or domestic burner controller can fail, but must fail in a safe mode (i.e. turn combustion off when they detect faults). Famously, nuclear weapon systems that launch-on-command are fail-safe, because if the communications systems fail, launch cannot be commanded. Railway signaling is designed to be fail-safe.
 Fail-secure systems maintain maximum security when they cannot operate. For example, while fail-safe electronic doors unlock during power failures, fail-secure ones will lock, keeping an area secure.
 Fail-Passive systems continue to operate in the event of a system failure. An example includes an aircraft autopilot. In the event of a failure, the aircraft would remain in a controllable state and allow the pilot to take over and complete the journey and perform a safe landing.
 Fault-tolerant systems avoid service failure when faults are introduced to the system. An example may include control systems for ordinary nuclear reactors. The normal method to tolerate faults is to have several computers continually test the parts of a system, and switch on hot spares for failing subsystems. As long as faulty subsystems are replaced or repaired at normal maintenance intervals, these systems are considered safe. The computers, power supplies and control terminals used by human beings must all be duplicated in these systems in some fashion.

Software engineering for safety-critical systems
Software engineering for safety-critical systems is particularly difficult. There are three aspects which can be applied to aid the engineering software for life-critical systems. First is process engineering and management. Secondly, selecting the appropriate tools and environment for the system. This allows the system developer to effectively test the system by emulation and observe its effectiveness. Thirdly, address any legal and regulatory requirements, such as FAA requirements for aviation. By setting a standard for which a system is required to be developed under, it forces the designers to stick to the requirements. The avionics industry has succeeded in producing standard methods for producing life-critical avionics software. Similar standards exist for industry, in general, (IEC 61508) and automotive (ISO 26262), medical (IEC 62304) and nuclear (IEC 61513) industries specifically. The standard approach is to carefully code, inspect, document, test, verify and analyze the system.  Another approach is to certify a production system, a compiler, and then generate the system's code from specifications. Another approach uses formal methods to generate proofs that the code meets requirements. All of these approaches improve the software quality in safety-critical systems by testing or eliminating manual steps in the development process, because people make mistakes, and these mistakes are the most common cause of potential life-threatening errors.

Examples of safety-critical systems

Infrastructure
 Circuit breaker
 Emergency services dispatch systems
 Electricity generation, transmission and distribution
 Fire alarm
 Fire sprinkler
 Fuse (electrical)
 Fuse (hydraulic)
 Life support systems
 Telecommunications

Medicine
The technology requirements can go beyond avoidance of failure, and can even facilitate medical intensive care (which deals with healing patients), and also life support (which is for stabilizing patients).
 Heart-lung machines
 Mechanical ventilation systems
 Infusion pumps and Insulin pumps
 Radiation therapy machines
 Robotic surgery machines
 Defibrillator machines
 Pacemaker devices
 Dialysis machines
 Devices that electronically monitor vital functions (electrography; especially, electrocardiography, ECG or EKG, and electroencephalography, EEG)
 Medical imaging devices (X-ray, computerized tomography- CT or CAT, different magnetic resonance imaging- MRI- techniques, positron emission tomography- PET)
 Even healthcare information systems have significant safety implications

Nuclear engineering
 Nuclear reactor control systems

Recreation
 Amusement rides
 Climbing equipment
 Parachutes
 Scuba equipment
 Diving rebreather
 Dive computer (depending on use)

Transport

Railway
 Railway signalling and control systems
 Platform detection to control train doors
 Automatic train stop

Automotive
 Airbag systems
 Braking systems
 Seat belts
 Power Steering systems
 Advanced driver-assistance systems
 Electronic throttle control
 Battery management system for hybrids and electric vehicles
 Electric park brake
 Shift by wire systems
 Drive by wire systems
 Park by wire

Aviation
 Air traffic control systems
 Avionics, particularly fly-by-wire systems
 Radio navigation RAIM
 Engine control systems
 Aircrew life support systems
 Flight planning to determine fuel requirements for a flight

Spaceflight
 Human spaceflight vehicles
 Rocket range launch safety systems
 Launch vehicle safety
 Crew rescue systems
 Crew transfer systems

See also
 
 
 
 
 
 
 
  (risk analysis software)
 
 
 
 High integrity software
Real-time computing

References

External links
 An Example of a Life-Critical System
 Safety-critical systems Virtual Library
 Explanation of Fail Operational and Fail Passive in Avionics

Engineering failures
Formal methods
Software quality
Safety
Risk analysis
Safety engineering
Computer systems
Control engineering